The 2021 Italian football summer transfer window runs from 1 July to 31 August 2021. This list includes transfers featuring at least one club from either Serie A or Serie B that were completed after the end of the winter 2020–21 transfer window on 31 January 2021 and before the end of the 2021 summer window on 31 August. While free agents can join a club at any time, deals between clubs that happened between 1 September and 2 January will be effective starting 3 January, when the winter 2021–22 transfer window will officially open.

Transfers
Legend
Those clubs in Italic indicate that the player already left the team on loan on this or the previous season or a new signing that immediately left the club.

Footnotes

References

2021–22 in Italian football
Italy
2021